Pernille Rosenkrantz-Theil (born 17 January 1977 in Skælskør) is a Danish politician, who is a member of the Folketing for the Social Democrats political party. From 2019 to 2022, she has served as Minister of Children and Education. She was elected into parliament at the 2011 Danish general election. She had previously been a member of parliament from 2001 to 2007 as a member of the Red-Green Alliance. From 2011 to 2014, she was the spokesperson on climate and energy for the Social Democrats.

Political career
From April 20 to July 31, 1999, Rosenkrantz-Theil was a temporary member of the parliament. She was elected to the parliament in 2001. From 1996 to 2007, she was a member of the central board and working committee of Red-Green Alliance. She was spokeswoman for equality, health, financial, educational, and ecclesiastical affairs. After a break from politics she joined the Social Democrats and was elected to the parliament in 2011. On 27 June 2019, she became the Minister of Education in the Frederiksen Cabinet.

Background
Rosenkrantz-Theil has been active in organizational activism and politics from an early age. During her high school years, from 1992 to 1995, she was a member of the executive committee of "Danske Gymnnasieelevers Sammenslutning" (Union of Upper Secondary School Students), an organization which works to improve high school students' conditions in Denmark. In 1998, she was campaign leader of "Operation Dagsværk" (Operation Day's Work), a nationwide charity activist day for Danish high school students. In her work life, Rosenkrantz-Theil has worked as consultant for Danish unions amongst other jobs. Rosenkrantz-Theil completed her bachelor's degree in political science in 2004 from the University of Copenhagen.

Bibliography
Hvilket velfærdssamfund? (2019)
Det betaler sig at investere i mennesker - en bog om sociale investeringer, tidlig indsats, finansministeriets regnemodeller & SØM (2018, co-author)
Ned og op med stress (2010)
Fra kamp til kultur - 20 smagsdommere skyder med skarpt (2004, contributor)
En dollar om dagen (2001, contributor)

References

External links
 
 Operation Dagsværk
 The Danish Red-Green Alliance

|-

1977 births
Living people
People from Slagelse Municipality
Danish writers
Social Democrats (Denmark) politicians
Red–Green Alliance (Denmark) politicians
Women government ministers of Denmark
Education ministers of Denmark
Women members of the Folketing
21st-century Danish women politicians
Rosenkrantz family
Members of the Folketing 2001–2005
Members of the Folketing 2005–2007
Members of the Folketing 2011–2015
Members of the Folketing 2015–2019
Members of the Folketing 2019–2022